The 1999–2000 OPJHL season is the seventh season of the Ontario Provincial Junior A Hockey League (OPJHL). The thirty-five teams of the North, South, East, and West divisions competed in a 49-game schedule.

Come February, the top eight teams of each division competed for the Frank L. Buckland Trophy, the OPJHL championship.  The winner of the Buckland Cup, the Brampton Capitals, failed to win the Dudley Hewitt Cup as Central Canadian Champions.

Changes
League returns to 4 divisions, from 3.
Auburn Jr. Crunch change name to Syracuse Jr. Crunch.
Shelburne Wolves leave OPJHL.
Caledon Canadians leave OPJHL.
Parry Sound Shamrocks join OPJHL from NOJHL.
St. Michael's Buzzers rejoin OPJHL.

Final standings

Note: GP = Games played; W = Wins; L = Losses; OTL = Overtime losses; SL = Shootout losses; GF = Goals for; GA = Goals against; PTS = Points; x = clinched playoff berth; y = clinched division title; z = clinched conference title

1999-2000 Frank L. Buckland Trophy Playoffs

Division Quarter-final
Lindsay Muskies defeated Peterborough Bees 4-games-to-none
Wellington Dukes defeated Bancroft Hawks 4-games-to-none
Kingston Voyageurs defeated Cobourg Cougars 4-games-to-none
Trenton Sting defeated Bowmanville Eagles 4-games-to-2
Brampton Capitals defeated Mississauga Chargers 4-games-to-1
Georgetown Raiders defeated Oakville Blades 4-games-to-3
Burlington Cougars defeated Milton Merchants 4-games-to-3
Streetsville Derbys defeated Hamilton Kiltys 4-games-to-3
Newmarket Hurricanes defeated Parry Sound Shamrocks 4-games-to-none
Couchiching Terriers defeated Ajax Axemen 4-games-to-none
Stouffville Spirit defeated Aurora Tigers 4-games-to-none
Collingwood Blues defeated Huntsville Wildcats 4-games-to-3
Vaughan Vipers defeated Pickering Panthers 4-games-to-none
Thornhill Rattlers defeated Oshawa Legionaires 4-games-to-1
Wexford Raiders defeated St. Michael's Buzzers 4-games-to-1
Markham Waxers defeated North York Rangers 4-games-to-3
Division Semi-final
Couchiching Terriers defeated Collingwood Blues 4-games-to-1
Stouffville Spirit defeated Newmarket Hurricanes 4-games-to-2
Vaughan Vipers defeated Markham Waxers 4-games-to-1
Thornhill Rattlers defeated Wexford Raiders 4-games-to-1
Wellington Dukes defeated Trenton Sting 4-games-to-none
Lindsay Muskies defeated Kingston Voyageurs 4-games-to-none
Georgetown Raiders defeated Burlington Cougars 4-games-to-3
Brampton Capitals defeated Streetsville Derbys 4-games-to-none
Division Final
Couchiching Terriers defeated Stouffville Spirit 4-games-to-none
Thornhill Rattlers defeated Vaughan Vipers 4-games-to-none
Lindsay Muskies defeated Wellington Dukes 4-games-to-1
Brampton Capitals defeated Georgetown Raiders 4-games-to-none
Semi-final
Brampton Capitals defeated Couchiching Terriers 4-games-to-none
Lindsay Muskies defeated Thornhill Rattlers 4-games-to-1
Final
Brampton Capitals defeated Lindsay Muskies 4-games-to-2

Dudley Hewitt Cup Championship
Best-of-7 series
Rayside-Balfour Sabrecats (NOJHL) defeated Brampton Capitals 4-games-to-1
Rayside-Balfour 4 - Brampton 1
Brampton 4 - Rayside-Balfour 1
Rayside-Balfour 2 - Brampton 1
Rayside-Balfour 3 - Brampton 2
Rayside-Balfour 13 - Brampton 1

Scoring leaders
Note: GP = Games played; G = Goals; A = Assists; Pts = Points; PIM = Penalty minutes

Players selected in 2000 NHL Entry Draft
Rd 3 #67	Max Birbraer -	New Jersey Devils	(Newmarket Hurricanes)

See also
 2000 Royal Bank Cup
 Dudley Hewitt Cup
 List of OJHL seasons
 Northern Ontario Junior Hockey League
 Superior International Junior Hockey League
 Greater Ontario Junior Hockey League
 1999 in ice hockey
 2000 in ice hockey

References

External links
 Official website of the Ontario Junior Hockey League
 Official website of the Canadian Junior Hockey League

Ontario Junior Hockey League seasons
OPJHL